Butch Cassidy and the Sundance Kids is a 30-minute Saturday morning animated series produced by Hanna-Barbera Productions and broadcast on NBC from September 8, 1973, to December 1, 1973. The series title is a play on the name of the unrelated 1969 film Butch Cassidy and the Sundance Kid. The character's music group is called the Sun Dance Kids.

Plot
Similar to both Scooby-Doo, Where Are You! and Josie and the Pussycats on CBS, the show depicts the adventures of the titular teen pop group. The band consists of 4 heartthrobs: Butch Cassidy (lead vocals and lead guitar); mini-skirted blonde beauty Merilee (tambourine); sensible Stephanie, nicknamed Steffy (bass guitar); and curly-haired Wally (drums). Accompanied by Wally's dog Elvis, these popular rock stars lead double lives as government-backed crime-fighters. 

The teens are advised by a supercomputer named Mr. Socrates, who is (somehow) violently allergic to dogs. When the group meets with Mr. Socrates in his lair for their latest assignment, Elvis is always told to stay outside. Yet Elvis always ends up inside the lair, by his own ingenuity and/or by Wally's forgetfulness. Elvis's mere presence causes Mr. Socrates to sneeze and go haywire; Mr. Socrates then sends the group out of the lair, and off to their assignment. Butch, designated as "Sundance 1", wears a special communicator-ring which keeps him in contact with Mr. Socrates.

Cast
 Lloyd "Chip" Hand II as Butch Cassidy
 Micky Dolenz as Wally
 Kristina Holland as Stephanie
 John Stephenson as Mr. Socrates
 Judy Strangis as Merilee
 Frank Welker as Elvis, Wally's dog
 Cam Clarke as Vocalist

Episodes

Other appearances
 Butch Cassidy was also the subject of Issue #11 of Gold Key Comics' Hanna-Barbera Fun-In in 1974; the story, "The Pearl Caper," was adapted from the October 6, 1973 Butch Cassidy TV episode of the same name.
 Characters from Butch Cassidy appeared several times on the Adult Swim animated television series Sealab 2021. The whole band appeared in the episode "All That Jazz" in a long shot at a concert, standing in for MC Chris as Butch Cassidy and the Sun Dance Kids and performing the song "Fett's Vette". In a later episode, "Let 'Em Eat Corn!", the band appears again as inhabitants of SeaLab Pod Six, with both Butch and Wally both sporting mustaches on their faces. Then again, in the episode "Butchslap", the characters appeared alongside Marco, who was revealed to be one of the Sun Dance Kids. The character models for Butch and Wally were also used for the animated likeness of John Miller (the series director) and Adam Reed (one of the series writers) in the episodes, "Swimming in Oblivion" and "Return to Oblivion".
 Four songs from the show were released as singles on Romar Records. An full LP was mentioned on the labels as forthcoming, but was never released.

Home media
On January 15, 2013, Warner Archive released Butch Cassidy and the Sundance Kids: The Complete Series on DVD in region 1 as part of their Hanna–Barbera Classics Collection. This is a Manufacture-on-Demand (MOD) release, available exclusively through Warner's online store and Amazon.com.

The series is also available at the iTunes Store.

References

External links
 
 

1973 American television series debuts
1973 American television series endings
1970s American animated television series
1970s American musical comedy television series
1970s American mystery television series
American children's animated adventure television series
American children's animated comedy television series
American children's animated musical television series
American children's animated mystery television series
NBC original programming
Animated musical groups
Television series by Hanna-Barbera
Hanna-Barbera characters
Teen animated television series
English-language television shows